The Never Ending Tour is the popular name for Bob Dylan's ongoing touring schedule which began on June 7, 1988. During the course of the tour, musicians have come and gone as the band has continued to evolve. The tour amassed a huge fan base with some fans traveling from around the world to attend as many Dylan shows as possible.

Dylan himself has been dismissive of the Never Ending Tour tag. In the sleeve notes to his album World Gone Wrong (1993), Dylan wrote:

His subsequent touring schedule has continued to be referred to as the "Never Ending Tour" by most media outlets. 

According to Swedish researcher Olof Björner, Dylan played his 2,000th show of the Never Ending Tour on October 16, 2007, in Dayton, Ohio. He played his 3,000th show of the Never Ending Tour on April 19, 2019, in Innsbruck, Austria. Dylan has attributed much of the versatility of his live shows to the talent of his backing band, with whom he recorded each of his 21st-century studio albums: Love and Theft (2001); Modern Times (2006); Together Through Life (2009); Christmas in the Heart (2009); Tempest (2012); Shadows in the Night (2015); Fallen Angels (2016); Triplicate (2017) and Rough and Rowdy Ways (2020). 

Following the 2019 touring year, performances in Japan and the US were cancelled during 2020 due to the COVID-19 pandemic. On September 27, 2021, via his official website, Dylan announced a new tour called the Rough and Rowdy Ways World Wide Tour, spanning 2021-2024, with the tour starting in November. This tour has been referred to by the media as an extension of his ongoing Never Ending Tour.

Origin
The tour's name was cemented when journalist Adrian Deevoy published his interview with Dylan in Q Magazine no.39, December 1989. The critic Michael Gray listened to Deevoy's interview tape, and points out in The Bob Dylan Encyclopedia that though Deevoy's article put the phrase into Dylan's mouth, in fact the label came from Deevoy in the following exchange:
AD: 'Tell me about this live thing. You've gone straight into this tour again — one tour virtually straight into the next one.'
BD: 'Oh, it's all the same tour.'
AD: 'It's the Never Ending Tour?'
BD: (unenthusiastically) 'Yeah, yeah'.
In a 2009 interview with Rolling Stone magazine, Dylan queried the validity of the term Never Ending Tour, saying:Critics should know there is no such thing as forever. Does anybody call Henry Ford a Never Ending Car Builder? Anybody ever say that Duke Ellington was on a Never Ending Bandstand Tour? These days, people are lucky to have a job. Any job. So critics might be uncomfortable with my working so much. Anybody with a trade can work as long as they want. A carpenter, an electrician. They don't necessarily need to retire.

The tour was briefly interrupted in the spring of 1997 when Dylan was forced to cancel dates after suffering a serious medical issue in May. CBS Records announced he was being hospitalized for a potentially fatal chest infection, histoplasmosis, but Dylan resumed touring that fall.

Books, live recordings and broadcasts

Andrew Muir published Razor's Edge: Bob Dylan and the Never Ending Tour in September 2001. The book chronicles the first fifteen years of Dylan's Never Ending Tour from the point of view of a committed fan of the Tour, analysing how Dylan varies his interpretations of his songs, and exploring Dylan's possible motivations. In July 2013, Muir updated Razor's Edge when he published One More Night: Bob Dylan's Never Ending Tour: this book covers Dylan's touring activities from 1988 to 2011.

The only complete live album of material recorded with the Never Ending Tour band is MTV Unplugged, recorded in 1994 and released in 1995.

In 1994, Bob Dylan's performance of "Highway 61 Revisited" was recorded at Woodstock '94 and released on CD and VHS.

In 2001, Sony released Live 1961–2000: Thirty-Nine Years of Great Concert Performances which included six songs recorded on the Never Ending Tour between 1994 and 2000. The songs were: "Somebody Touched Me", "Dignity", "Cold Irons Bound", "Born in Time", "Country Pie" and "Things Have Changed".

Dylan's performance of "Down Along the Cove" from the Bonnaroo Music Festival 2004 was released on the Bonnaroo 2004 CD by Sanctuary Records in 2005.

Spanish TV station TVE2 broadcast three songs, "It Ain't Me Babe", "Rollin' and Tumblin'" and "Just Like Tom Thumb's Blues", from the concert that Dylan performed at the Rock In Rio Festival, in Madrid on July 6, 2008.

Dylan's 2008 album, The Bootleg Series Vol. 8: Tell Tale Signs: Rare and Unreleased 1989–2006, included five live performances from the Never Ending Tour, recorded between 1992 and 2004. The songs were "High Water (For Charley Patton)", "Ring Them Bells", "Cocaine Blues", "The Girl on the Greenbriar Shore", and "Lonesome Day Blues". A deluxe three-disc version of the album included additional live performances from the Never Ending Tour of "Cold Irons Bound", "Things Have Changed" and "Tryin' to Get to Heaven".

In 2009, former Never Ending Tour drummer Winston Watson released a DVD, Bob Dylan Never Ending Tour Diaries: Drummer Winston Watson's Incredible Journey, documenting his years touring with Dylan between 1992 and 1996.

Band

For a two and a half year period, between 2003 and 2006, Dylan ceased playing guitar, and stuck solely to the keyboard during concerts. Various rumors circulated as to why Dylan gave up guitar during this period, none very reliable. According to David Gates, a Newsweek reporter who interviewed Dylan in 2004, "basically it has to do with his guitar not giving him quite the fullness of sound he was wanting at the bottom. He's thought of hiring a keyboard player so he doesn't have to do it himself, but hasn't been able to figure out who. Most keyboard players, he says, like to be soloists, and he wants a very basic sound". Dylan's touring band typically features two guitarists along with a multi-instrumentalist who plays pedal & lap steel, mandolin, banjo, violin and viola. From 2002 to 2005, Dylan's keyboard had a piano sound. In 2006, this was changed to an organ sound. At the start of his Spring 2007 tour in Europe, Dylan once again began playing guitar. The last time Dylan played an acoustic guitar live was at the White House's Celebration of Music from the Civil Rights concert in 2010. As of the most recent leg of the Never Ending Tour, in fall 2019, he mostly played piano but would also occasionally play songs on electric guitar and take center-stage with just his harmonica and microphone.

The most recent leg of the Never Ending Tour, in the Fall of 2019, consisted of the following members:
Bob Dylan — vocals, piano, harmonica, guitar
Donnie Herron — pedal steel, lap steel, electric mandolin, banjo, violin
Charlie Sexton — lead guitar
Tony Garnier — bass guitar
Matt Chamberlain — drums, percussion
Bob Britt — guitar

During a 2006 interview with Rolling Stone magazine, Dylan spoke about his band at that time: This is the best band I've ever been in, I've ever had, man for man. When you play with guys a hundred times a year, you know what you can and can't do, what they're good at, whether you want 'em there. It takes a long time to find a band of individual players. Most bands are gangs. Whether it's a metal group or pop rock, whatever, you get that gang mentality. But for those of us who went back further, gangs were the mob. The gang was not what anybody aspired to. On this record [Modern Times] I didn't have anybody to teach. I got guys now in my band, they can whip up anything, they surprise even me.

Other notable members include Stu Kimball (guitar from 2004-2018), Denny Freeman (guitar, slide guitar from 2005–2009), Larry Campbell (guitar, slide guitar, pedal steel, banjo, cittern, mandolin and violin from 1997–2004), George Receli (drums from 2002-2019), Freddy Koella (guitar from 2003–2004), David Kemper (drums from 1996–2001), Bucky Baxter (pedal steel from 1992–1999), John "J.J." Jackson (guitar from 1991–1997) and G.E. Smith (guitar from 1988–1990). Between the years 2003-2004, Tommy Morrongiello, a technician on the tour, would frequently play guitar with Dylan & his Band. Charlie Sexton, who played the guitar from 1999 until 2002, returned as the lead guitarist in Dylan's band for the fall 2009 tour, replacing Denny Freeman. Sexton was in turn replaced by Duke Robillard for the first half of 2013, before returning on July 3, 2013. Sexton was replaced for seven concerts by Colin Linden before returning once again on July 26, 2013.

Over the years, many artists have been special guests at shows, playing songs with Dylan and his band. Artists include Phil Lesh, Jack White, Paul Simon, Ronnie Wood, Bruce Springsteen, Bono, Norah Jones, Willie Nelson, John Mellencamp, Tom Petty, Neil Young, Jimmie Vaughan, Carl Perkins, Elvis Costello, Amos Lee, Patti Smith, Van Morrison, Joni Mitchell, Warren Haynes, Al Kooper, Jorma Kaukonen, Paul James, Kenny Wayne Shepherd, Dave Stewart, Chrissie Hynde, Nils Lofgren, Dave Matthews, Susan Tedeschi, Dave Alvin, Chuck Loeb, Dickey Betts, Bob Weir, Ian Moore, Roger McGuinn, Cesar Diaz, Boyd Tinsley, LeRoi Moore, Doug Sahm, Aimee Mann, Liz Souissi, Ray Benson, Leon Russell, Lukas Nelson, Carlos Santana and Mark Knopfler.

Timeline

Tours

1980s
1988
1989

1990s
1990
1991
1992
1993
1994
1995
1996
1997
1998
1999

2000s
2000
2001
2002
2003
2004
2005
2006
2007
2008
2009

2010s
2010
2011
2012
2013
2014
2015
2016
2017
2018
2019

2020s

Notes

References

External links

BobLinks – Comprehensive log of concerts and set lists with categorized link collection
Bjorner's Still on the Road – Information on all known recording sessions and performances by Dylan
Le-cartographe.net/ Maps of the Never Ending Tour

Bob Dylan concert tours
1980s in music
1990s in music
2000s in music
2010s in music